Lalin may refer to:

 Lalin, Iran, a city in Iran
 Lalin, Poland, a village in Poland
 Lalín, a municipality in Spain
 Lalín (surname)